is a railway station in the town of Kanie, Ama District, Aichi Prefecture, Japan, operated by Central Japan Railway Company (JR Tōkai).

Lines
Kanie Station is served by the Kansai Main Line, and is located 9.3  kilometers from the starting point of the line at Nagoya Station.

Station layout
The station has two opposed side platforms, with platform 1 adjacent to the station building. The platforms are connected by an uncovered footbridge. Three rail lines pass between the platforms, with the middle, non-electrified line used for freight traffic. The station building has automated ticket machines, TOICA automated turnstiles and is staffed.

Platforms

Adjacent stations

|-
!colspan=5|Central Japan Railway Company (JR Tōkai)

Station history
Kanei Station was established on May 24, 1895, as a station on the Kansai Railway. The Kansai Railway was nationalized on October 1, 1907, becoming part of the Japanese Government Railways (JGR) system. The JGR became the JNR (Japan National Railways) after World War II. With the privatization of the JNR on April 1, 1987, the station came under the control of JR Central.

Station numbering was introduced to the section of the Kansai Main Line operated JR Central in March 2018; Kanei Station was assigned station number CI03.

Surrounding area
Gakuto Elementary School
Sunishi Elementary School

See also
 List of Railway Stations in Japan

References

External links

Railway stations in Japan opened in 1895
Kansai Main Line
Stations of Central Japan Railway Company
Railway stations in Aichi Prefecture